Fitzstephen French PC (7 December 1801 – 4 June 1873) was a Whig Member of Parliament for Roscommon. He was the younger brother of Captain Charles French, 3rd Baron De Freyne and a son of Arthur French. Elected in 1832, he held the seat up until his death aged 71 in 1873. He was resident in London for most of this time.

References

1801 births
1873 deaths
People from County Roscommon
19th-century Irish people
Members of the Parliament of the United Kingdom for County Roscommon constituencies (1801–1922)
UK MPs 1832–1835
UK MPs 1835–1837
UK MPs 1837–1841
UK MPs 1841–1847
UK MPs 1847–1852
UK MPs 1852–1857
UK MPs 1857–1859
UK MPs 1859–1865
UK MPs 1865–1868
UK MPs 1868–1874
Members of the Privy Council of Ireland
British Militia officers